Mickey One is a 1965 American neo noir crime film starring Warren Beatty and directed by Arthur Penn from a script by Alan Surgal.

Plot
After incurring the wrath of the Mafia, a stand-up comic (Warren Beatty) flees Detroit for Chicago, taking the name Mickey One (from the ethnic name Miklos Wunejeva on a Social Security card he steals from a homeless man). He uses the card to get a job at a seedy diner hauling garbage. He saves up enough money from his low wages to rent a room at a local flop house and buy himself some new clothes. Eventually he returns to the stage as a stand-up comic, but is wary of becoming successful, afraid that he will attract too much attention. When he gets a booking at the upscale club Xanadu, he finds that his first rehearsal has become a special "audition" for an unseen man with a frightening, gruff voice (Aram Avakian). Paranoid that the mob has found him, Mickey runs away. He decides to find out who "owns" him and square himself with the mob.  However, he doesn't know what he did to anger them or what his debt is. Searching for a mobster who will talk to him, he gets beaten up by several nightclub doormen. Mickey finally concludes that it's impossible to get away and be safe, so he pulls himself together and does his act anyway.

In traveling about the city, Mickey continually sees a mute mime-like character known only as The Artist (Kamatari Fujiwara). The Artist eventually unleashes his Rube Goldberg-like creation, a deliberately self-destructive machine called "Yes," an homage to the sculptor Jean Tinguely.

Cast

Release and reception
Penn received a nomination for a Golden Lion at the Venice Film Festival. However, critical reaction was mostly negative.  Bosley Crowther in The New York Times praised the visual style but claimed that the film was "pretentious and monotonous."  Time called the film, "never boring but never very precise, and finally goes to pieces amidst the crash of its own symbols." In 1979, James Monaco wrote Mickey One 'except for Woody Allen's Interiors, is the most pretentious film by a major American filmmaker in the last thirty years'.

Beatty and Penn did not get along while making this film.  Beatty later recalled, "We had a lot of trouble on that film, because I didn't know what the hell Arthur was trying to do and I tried to find out ... I'm not sure that he knew himself" and added, "To me, the stand-up gags that the guy had to do in Mickey One were not funny and that was always my complaint with Arthur."  Producer Harrison Starr recalled, "Warren and Arthur had go-arounds ... the role was basically a role of an eccentric, a person whose inner demons were reflected in the world he inhabited ... and I think that was difficult for Warren to play."  Nevertheless, Beatty and Penn teamed again for Bonnie and Clyde in 1967.

Rediscovery
The rediscovery of the film began in 1995 with a booking at San Francisco's Castro Theater and a reevaluation by Peter Stack:

Soundtrack

The soundtrack was arranged by Eddie Sauter and performed by tenor saxophonist Stan Getz.

The film's soundtrack, reverberating with hints of everything from Béla Bartók to bossa nova, reteamed Stan Getz with arranger Eddie Sauter, following their album Focus (1961).

See also
List of American films of 1965
Lenny-1974 film about Lenny Bruce similar in content
French New Wave

Notes

External links

Village Voice: "Mickey One at MOMA" by J. Hoberman (April 15, 2008)

1965 films
American crime drama films
American black-and-white films
Films directed by Arthur Penn
Films set in Chicago
Films shot in Chicago
1965 crime drama films
American neo-noir films
1960s English-language films
1960s American films